The 1970–71 All-Ireland Senior Club Hurling Championship was the first season of the All-Ireland Senior Club Hurling Championship, the Gaelic Athletic Association's premier club hurling tournament. The All-Ireland series began on 14 November 1971 and ended on 19 December 1971.

Roscrea won the title after defeating St. Rynagh's by 4-5 to 2-5 in the final.

Results

Connacht Senior Club Hurling Championship

Final

Leinster Senior Club Hurling Championship

First round

Quarter-finals

Semi-finals

Final

Munster Senior Club Hurling Championship

Quarter-finals

Semi-finals

Final

Ulster Senior Club Hurling Championship

Final

All-Ireland Senior Club Hurling Championship

Semi-finals

Final

Statistics

Miscellaneous

 Roscrea became the second team to retain the Munster title following a 4-11 to 1-6 defeat of Clarecastle.

References

1970 in hurling
1971 in hurling
All-Ireland Senior Club Hurling Championship